Ochsenheimeria vacculella, the cereal stem moth, is a moth of the family Ypsolophidae. It is found in most of Europe, except Ireland, Norway, Portugal, Italy and most of the Balkan Peninsula. The species was accidentally introduced into parts of the United States.

Adults are on wing in July and August.

The larvae feed on Agropyron cristatum, Elymus caninus, Elymus repens, Bromus erectus, Bromus inermis, Festuca pratensis, Lolium, Phleum pratense, Poa, Secale cereale and Triticum aestivum. First instar larvae mine the leaves of their host plant. Later instars bore in the stems. Pupation takes place among the leaves or in crevices. The larvae have a whitish body. They can be found from April to May.

References

Moths described in 1842
Ypsolophidae
Moths of Europe
Taxa named by Josef Emanuel Fischer von Röslerstamm